The Solomon Goffe House is a historic house museum at 677 North Colony Street in Meriden, Connecticut, United States. It was built in 1711, and is the oldest remaining building in the city of Meriden.  It is owned by the city and is open for tours during the summer, or by appointment.

Description and history
The Solomon Goffe House is located north of downtown Meriden, on the east side of North Colony Street between Griswold and Maynard Streets.  It is a -story wood-frame structure, with a gambrel roof, central chimney, and clapboarded exterior.  It is eight bays wide, with two entrances and six windows; there are four shed-roof dormers on the front roof face.  The interior has undergone significant alterations, but three downstairs rooms remain relatively unaltered, and other features are preserved elsewhere.

The house was built about 1711 by Solomon Goffe, about whom little is known.  It was probably constructed at first as a five-bay structure, with the northern three bays added later.  It had received numerous small additions in the 20th century, most of which have been removed during restoration.

Current use
The house is currently a museum owned by the city. There are tours the first Sunday of the month from April to November 1:30pm to 4:30pm. Each month has a different theme.  One of the highlights of the landscaping is its traditional herb garden, which was designed after examples of typical 18th century herb gardens in the area.

The Archaeology Society of Connecticut has done some digs on the property and found a number of objects, including an axe blade.

See also
 List of the oldest buildings in Connecticut
National Register of Historic Places listings in New Haven County, Connecticut

References

External links
 Solomon Goffe House - Meriden Patch

Buildings and structures in Meriden, Connecticut
Houses completed in 1711
Goffe House
Saltbox architecture in Connecticut
Houses in New Haven County, Connecticut
Archaeological sites in Connecticut
Museums in New Haven County, Connecticut
Historic house museums in Connecticut
National Register of Historic Places in New Haven County, Connecticut
1711 establishments in Connecticut